Garuleum is a genus of flowering plants in the sunflower family, native to southern Africa. Garuleum is one of eight genera of Calenduleae.

Description 
The style of disc florets are deeply bifurcate (forked) with linear lobes. They are covered with papillae to well below point of bifurcation.

Species 
The following species are recognised:
 Garuleum album S.Moore - Cape Provinces
 Garuleum bipinnatum Less. - Cape Provinces
 Garuleum latifolium Harv. - KwaZulu-Natal
 Garuleum pinnatifidum DC. - Cape Provinces, Free State, Limpopo
 Garuleum schinzii O.Hoffm. ex Schinz - Cape Provinces, Namibia
 Garuleum sonchifolium (DC.) Norl. - KwaZulu-Natal, Cape Provinces
 Garuleum tanacetifolium (MacOwan) Norl. - Cape Provinces
 Garuleum woodii Schinz - KwaZulu-Natal, Free State, Limpopo, Lesotho

References

Calenduleae
Asteraceae genera
Flora of Southern Africa